Miguel González (24 September 1938 – 4 July 2022) was a Spanish basketball player. He competed in the men's tournament at the 1960 Summer Olympics.

References

External links
 

1938 births
2022 deaths
Spanish men's basketball players
Olympic basketball players of Spain
Basketball players at the 1960 Summer Olympics
Sportspeople from Valencia
Joventut Badalona players
FC Barcelona Bàsquet players